Arborfield Hall was a large country house on the banks of the River Loddon near the village of Arborfield in Berkshire.

History
The manor house, which originally stood on the site, was occupied by the Bullock family from the early 13th century. It was acquired by Edmund Standen in 1589 and passed to his son, William Standen, who rebuilt the house in Jacobean style in 1603. A stable block was added in 1654. The manor house was sold to Pelsant Reeves, a Master in Chancery, in 1730 and it remained in the Reeves family until George Dawson, a descendant, demolished it in 1832. George Dawson commissioned a new hall in 1837 but sold it to Sir John Conroy, Controller of the Household of the Duchess of Kent, in 1842. The new hall was bought by Thomas Hargreaves, a businessman who became High Sheriff of Berkshire, in 1855 and it remained in the Hargreaves family until 1926. The hall was then bought at auction by the Allsebrook family. It was requisitioned by the Royal Air Force during the Second World War and then acquired by the University of Reading after the war: the university demolished it in 1955.

References

Country houses in Berkshire
Borough of Wokingham
Jacobethan architecture
Demolished buildings and structures in England